Achutupo Airport  is an airport serving the island town of Achutupo, in the San Blas archipelago of Panama.

There is rising terrain south of the runway. North approach and departure are over the water.

Airlines and destinations

See also

Transport in Panama
List of airports in Panama

References

External links
OpenStreetMap - Achutupo
Great Circle Mapper - Achutupo

 Google Earth

Airports in Panama
Guna Yala